Manuel Antonio Mercado y de la Paz 
(28 January 1838, Piedad de Cabadas, Michoacán, México – 9 June 1909, México City ), also known as Manuel Mercado  was a Mexican politician and lawyer, and served as Secretary of State for the Federal District (Distrito Federal) of Mexico (Mexico City) in the  administration of Sebastián Lerdo de Tejada.
Lawyer; bar of México 1861

Career

On January 19, 1860, Manuel Antonio Mercado, a law student, delivered a commencement inaugural address at the School of Jurisprudence. The speech was later published.

Life

Manuel Antonio Mercado was a dear friend of José Martí since 1875, year when Martí, who along with his parents, had moved to Mexico from Cuba. Almost two decades later, on May 18, 1895, just hours before José Martí was gunned down by Spaniard troops while fighting for the Independence of Cuba during the Battle of Dos Ríos, he wrote a letter to Mercado, wherein he expressed, his final thoughts to gain the Independence of Cuba. Martí's letter, albeit unfinished, was published posthumously.

Bibliography

Notes

Citations

References

External links 
 Manuel Antonio Mercado y de la Paz :es:Manuel Antonio Mercado

1838 births
1909 deaths
19th-century Mexican lawyers
State political office-holders in Mexico
Politicians from Michoacán
People from La Piedad